The 1912 Michigan State Normal Normalites football team represented Michigan State Normal College (later renamed Eastern Michigan University) during the 1912 college football season.  In their first season under head coach Leroy Brown, the Normalites compiled a record of 4–2–1 and outscored their opponents by a combined total of 83 to 45.  For the second consecutive year, S. B. Crouse was the team captain.

Schedule

References

Michigan State Normal
Eastern Michigan Eagles football seasons
Michigan State Normal Normalites football